Benjamin M. Tucker (December 13, 1930 – June 4, 2013) was an American jazz bassist who appeared on hundreds of recordings. Tucker played on albums by Art Pepper, Billy Taylor, Quincy Jones, Grant Green, Dexter Gordon, Hank Crawford, Junior Mance, and Herbie Mann.

He was born in Tennessee. As bass player in the Dave Bailey Quintet in 1961, he wrote the instrumental version of the song "Comin' Home Baby!", first issued on the album Two Feet in the Gutter. Bob Dorough later wrote a lyric to the song, and the vocal version became a Top 40 hit for jazz singer Mel Tormé in 1962.

Tucker released the album Baby, You Should Know It (Ava, 1963) with Victor Feldman, Larry Bunker, Bobby Thomas, Ray Crawford, Tommy Tedesco, and Carlos "Patato" Valdes.

By 1972, Tucker owned two radio stations, WSOK-AM, which had over 400,000 listeners, and WLVH-FM. Both of these were located in his hometown of Savannah, Georgia.

He died in a traffic collision in Hutchinson Island, Georgia, on June 4, 2013.

Discography
With Mose Allison
 The Word from Mose (Atlantic, 1964)
With Dave Bailey
 Reaching Out (Jazztime, 1961)
 Bash! (Jazzline, 1961)
 2 Feet in the Gutter (Epic, 1961)
With Kenny Burrell
 On View at the Five Spot Cafe (Blue Note, 1959)
 Freedom (Blue Note, 1964 [1980])
 Swingin' (Blue Note, 1956 [rel. 1980])
With Eddie "Lockjaw" Davis
 Love Calls (RCA Victor, 1968)
With Lou Donaldson
 Gravy Train (Blue Note, 1961)
With Teddy Edwards
 Sunset Eyes (Pacific Jazz, 1960)
 It's All Right! (Prestige, 1967)
With Gil Evans
 The Individualism of Gil Evans (Verve, 1964)
With Dexter Gordon
 Clubhouse (Blue Note, 1965 [1979])
With Grant Green
 Green Street (Blue Note, 1961)
 Sunday Mornin' (Blue Note, 1961)
 Grantstand (Blue Note, 1961)
With Chico Hamilton
 Chico Hamilton Trio Introducing Freddie Gambrell (World Pacific, 1958)
With Roland Hanna
Easy to Love (ATCO, 1960)
With Willis Jackson
 Gator's Groove (Prestige, 1969)
With Illinois Jacquet
 The Message (Prestige, 1963)
 Bottoms Up (Prestige, 1968)
With Quincy Jones
 Quincy's Got a Brand New Bag (Mercury, 1965)
With Clifford Jordan
 Soul Fountain (Vortex, 1966 [1970])
With Yusef Lateef
 The Centaur and the Phoenix (Riverside, 1960)
With Junior Mance
 The Soulful Piano of Junior Mance (Jazzland, 1960)
With Herbie Mann
 Herbie Mann at the Village Gate (Atlantic, 1961)
 Herbie Mann Live at Newport (Atlantic, 1963)
 Standing Ovation at Newport (Atlantic, 1965)
With Warne Marsh
Jazz of Two Cities (Imperial, 1956)
With Pat Martino
 Strings! (Prestige, 1967)
 East! (Prestige, 1968)
With James Moody
 The Blues and Other Colors (Milestone, 1969)
With Gerry Mulligan
 Jeru (Columbia, 1962)
With Mark Murphy
 That's How I Love the Blues! (Riverside, 1963)
With Oliver Nelson
 Fantabulous (Argo, 1964)
With Art Pepper
 The Art Pepper Quartet (Tampa, 1956)
Art Pepper with Warne Marsh (Contemporary, 1956 [1986]) with Warne Marsh
 Collections (Intro, 1957) with Red Norvo, Joe Morello and Gerry Wiggins
 Modern Art (Intro, 1957)
 Mucho Calor (Andex, 1957) with Conte Candoli
With Lalo Schifrin
 Samba Para Dos (Verve, 1963) with Bob Brookmeyer
With Bola Sete
 Bossa Nova (Fantasy, 1962)
With Jimmy Smith
 Got My Mojo Workin' (Verve, 1966)With Jeremy SteigFlute Fever (Columbia, 1964)With Sonny Stitt Sax Expressions (Roost, 1965)With Billy Taylor I Wish I Knew How It Would Feel to Be Free (Tower, 1968)
 Sleeping Bee (MPS, 1969)With Harold Vick' Commitment'' (Muse, 1967 [1974])

References

1930 births
2013 deaths
American jazz double-bassists
Male double-bassists
Musicians from Savannah, Georgia
Road incident deaths in Georgia (U.S. state)
Tennessee State University alumni
American male jazz musicians